All We Had is a 2016 American drama film directed by Katie Holmes and written by Josh Boone. It is based on the 2014 novel All We Had by Annie Weatherwax. The film stars Katie Holmes, Stefania LaVie Owen, Luke Wilson, Richard Kind, Mark Consuelos, Judy Greer and Eve Lindley. The film was released on December 9, 2016, by Gravitas Ventures.

All We Had is the directorial debut of Katie Holmes and she dedicated the film to her daughter, Suri.

Premise
Set during the worldwide financial crisis in 2008, a single mother (Katie Holmes) and her teenage daughter (Stefania LaVie Owen) find a new home and hope for their future when they move to a small Midwestern town.

Cast
Katie Holmes as Rita Carmichael 
Stefania LaVie Owen as Ruthie Carmichael
Luke Wilson as Lee 
Richard Kind as Marty
Mark Consuelos as Vic 
Judy Greer as Patti 
Eve Lindley as Pam
Siobhan Fallon Hogan as Mrs. Frankfurt
Katherine Reis as Sally 
Odiseas Gregory Georgiadis as Ben
Amber Jones/Amber the Fangirl as a Girl
Alexander Bender/AmazzonKane as Jenny

Production
On July 30, 2014, Katie Holmes optioned the film rights to the 2014 novel All We Had by Annie Weatherwax. On September 11, 2014, it was announced Holmes would direct the film. Holmes met with filmmaker Josh Boone about writing the screenplay, and Boone brought on frequent collaborator Jill Killington to co-write the screenplay with him. On July 31, 2015, Stefania LaVie Owen joined the cast of the film. On September 9, 2015, Mark Consuelos joined the cast of the film. Principal photography began on August 5, 2015, and ended on September 4, 2015.

Release and reception
The film premiered at the Tribeca Film Festival on April 15, 2016. The film was released on December 9, 2016, by Gravitas Ventures.

On review aggregator Rotten Tomatoes, the film holds an approval rating of 42% based on 24 reviews, with an average rating of 5.16/10. On Metacritic, the film has a weighted average score of 48 out of 100, based on 13 critics, indicating "mixed or average reviews". The Guardian gave the film three out of five stars, writing: "A stellar, brazen performance by the Dawson’s Creek actor and her strong cast keep this film, about the bond between a wayward mother and daughter, afloat." The New York Times wrote: "The soul of the movie is the complicated mother-daughter relationship, which changes as Ruthie, who narrates the story, observes Rita making the same mistakes again and again."

References

External links
 
 
 

2016 films
2016 drama films
American drama films
Films scored by Michael Brook
Films based on American novels
Films directed by Katie Holmes
2016 directorial debut films
Films set in 2008
Films about mother–daughter relationships
2010s English-language films
2010s American films